Hamid Shafiei (born July 8, 1981 in Isfahan, Iran) is an Iranian football player, who currently plays for IPL team Esteghlal.

Club career
After playing for Zob Ahan F.C. for a couple of seasons, in August 2006 he was transferred to Sepahan F.C. He has scored some vital goals for Sepahan, including the one in the final of Hazfi Cup in September 2006.

On August 7, 2007 Shafiei signed a contract with another IPL club, Esteghlal F.C. Where he was most of the time injured and left the club one season after to Aboosmolem and had another disaster season with the injuries and missed so many matches.

International career
He was called to the Iran U-23 team for the 2004 Athens Olympics qualifications. Despite the talent on the team, the Iran U-23 team did not qualify for the 2004 Summer Olympics.

In October 2006 he was called up to the Team Melli for an LG Cup tournament held in Jordan.

Honours
Sepahan:

Hazfi Cup Winner: 1
2006

Esteghlal:

Hazfi Cup Winner: 1
2008

Notes

Iranian footballers
Association football forwards
Sepahan S.C. footballers
Esteghlal F.C. players
Sportspeople from Isfahan
1981 births
Living people
Iran international footballers
F.C. Aboomoslem players
Zob Ahan Esfahan F.C. players